The Philadelphia Story is a 1939 American comic play by Philip Barry. It tells the story of a socialite whose wedding plans are complicated by the simultaneous arrival of her ex-husband and an attractive journalist. Written as a vehicle for Katharine Hepburn, its success marked a reversal of fortunes for the actress, who was one of the film stars deemed "box office poison" in 1938.

Production
The character of Tracy Lord was inspired by Helen Hope Montgomery Scott, a Philadelphia socialite known for her hijinks, who married a friend of playwright Philip Barry. Barry wrote The Philadelphia Story specifically for Katharine Hepburn, who ended up not only starring in but also financially backing the play, forgoing a salary in return for a percentage of the play's profits. The play was a great success on Broadway, and was Hepburn's first great triumph after a number of Hollywood failures had led the Independent Theatre Owners of America to publicly deem her and a number of other film stars "box office poison".

Produced by the Theatre Guild, The Philadelphia Story opened on March 28, 1939, at the Shubert Theatre in New York City, and closed on March 30, 1940. The three-act comedy was directed by Robert B. Sinclair, with lighting and scenery by Robert Edmond Jones.

Cast

 Lenore Lonergan as Dinah Lord
 Vera Allen as Margaret Lord
 Katharine Hepburn as Tracy Lord
 Dan Tobin as Alexander "Sandy" Lord
 Owen Coll as Thomas
 Forrest Orr as William Tracy
 Shirley Booth as Elizabeth Imbrie
 Van Heflin as Macauley Connor
 Frank Fenton as George Kittredge
 Joseph Cotten as C. K. Dexter Haven
 Nicholas Joy as Seth Lord
 Myrtle Tannahill as May
 Lorraine Bate as Elsie
 Hayden Rorke as Mac

Adaptations

Film
Hoping to create a film vehicle for herself which would erase the label, Hepburn accepted the film rights to the play from Howard Hughes, who had purchased them as a gift for her. She then convinced MGM's Louis B. Mayer to buy them from her for only $250,000 in return for Hepburn having veto over producer, director, screenwriter, and cast.

In 1940 the play was adapted to film, in a Metro-Goldwyn-Mayer picture directed by George Cukor with Hepburn as the star, and starring Cary Grant as C.K. Dexter Haven and James Stewart as Macaulay Connor.

In 1956, it was adapted to a Metro-Goldwyn-Mayer musical film version, High Society with Grace Kelly in the Tracy Lord role, Bing Crosby as C.K. Dexter Haven and Frank Sinatra as Macaulay Connor.

Radio
Radio adaptations of The Philadelphia Story include a half-hour presentation on The Prudential Family Hour of Stars (February 26, 1950), starring Sarah Churchill, Norma Jean Nilsson, Gerald Mohr and Gene Kelly. An hour-long adaptation was broadcast August 17, 1952, on Best Plays, with a cast including Joan Alexander, Betty Furness, Myron McCormick and Vera Allen.

Television
The Philadelphia Story was adapted for the second season of the NBC-TV series, Robert Montgomery Presents. Starring Barbara Bel Geddes (Tracy Lord), Richard Derr (Macauley Connor) and Leslie Nielsen (C. K. Dexter Haven), the one-hour live program aired December 4, 1950.

On December 8, 1954, a live 60-minute adaptation of the play was broadcast on the CBS-TV series, The Best of Broadway. The cast included Mary Astor (Margaret Lord), Dorothy McGuire (Tracy Lord), Charles Winninger (Uncle Willie), Neva Patterson (Liz Imbrie), Richard Carlson (Mike Connor), Dick Foran (George Kittredge), John Payne (C.K. Dexter Haven) and Herbert Marshall (Seth Lord).

A two-hour adaptation aired on NBC-TV on December 7, 1959, directed by Fielder Cook and starring Gig Young (C.K. Dexter Haven), Diana Lynn (Tracy Lord), Christopher Plummer (Mike Connor), Ruth Roman (Liz Imbrie), Mary Astor (Margaret Lord), Don DeFore (George Kittredge), Alan Webb (Seth Lord), and Leon Janney (Sidney Kidd). The instrumental theme for this version, "Tracy's Theme", was released as a single by Robert Mersey under the name "Spencer Ross" and became a Top 20 hit.

Copyright
Copyright for The Philadelphia Story was registered in 1939 by Barry and his wife, portrait artist Ellen Semple Barry, and was renewed by her in 1967. Her estate retains copyright to the play.

References

External links

 
 
 1952 Best Plays radio adaptation at Internet Archive

Plays by Philip Barry
1939 plays
Broadway plays
Comedy plays
Plays set in Pennsylvania
American plays adapted into films